Ram Pal Verma is an Indian politician and member of Bhartiya Janta Party.He is one of the senior leaders of the Bhartiya Janta Party.He is currently serving as a member of the Uttar Pradesh Legislative Assembly from Balamau. He is a nine time MLA.

Political career 
Ram Pal Verma was first elected to Uttar Pradesh Legislative Assembly in 1985 as an independent candidate. In 1988, he was re-elected to Uttar Pradesh Legislative Assembly on a Congress party ticket. He again became MLA in 1996.

Verma, on Bahujan Samaj Party ticket won the by-election in 2004. In 2007, he once again was elected to the Uttar Pradesh Legislative Assembly and was inducted as Minister of State with independent charge in the government.

Ram Pal Verma was elected from Balamau constituency in 2017 and 2022 on Bhartiya Janta Party ticket. In 2017, he defeated Neelu Satyarthi of BSP by a margin of 22888 votes.

In 2022, he defeated Rambali Verma by a margin of more than 26 thousand votes. Verma was inducted as a member of the panel of pro term Speaker of Uttar Pradesh assembly in the presence of chief minister Yogi Adityanath.

See also 

 18th Uttar Pradesh Assembly
 Uttar Pradesh Legislative Assembly
 Balamau Assembly constituency

References 

Living people
People from Uttar Pradesh
Uttar Pradesh MLAs 2022–2027
Uttar Pradesh MLAs 2017–2022
1959 births
Members of the Uttar Pradesh Legislative Council
Bharatiya Janata Party politicians from Uttar Pradesh
Uttar Pradesh MLAs 1985–1989
Uttar Pradesh MLAs 1989–1991
Uttar Pradesh MLAs 1997–2002
Uttar Pradesh MLAs 2002–2007
Uttar Pradesh MLAs 2007–2012